United Nations Security Council Resolution 1763 was unanimously adopted on 29 June 2007.

Resolution 
The Security Council today extended the mandate of the United Nations Operation in Côte d’Ivoire (UNOCI) until 16 July 2007, and reaffirmed its support for the peace and electoral processes in the divided West African country.

Acting under Chapter VII of the United Nations Charter, the Council unanimously adopted resolution 1763 (2007), by which it also decided to extend the mandate of the French forces supporting the mission.

United Nations Secretary-General Ban Ki-moon’s latest report on the situation in Côte d’Ivoire recommends that the mission maintain its current strength at least until the zone of confidence separating Government and rebel forces has been successfully replaced with a green line monitored by UNOCI observation posts.

He describes agreements signed by the parties in March as a “turning point” in the crisis that has kept Côte d’Ivoire divided since 2002 into the Government-controlled south and the Forces nouvelles-held north.  The report emphasizes, however, that many fundamental issues remain unresolved.

See also 
List of United Nations Security Council Resolutions 1701 to 1800 (2006–2008)

References

External links
Text of the Resolution at undocs.org

 1763
 1763
June 2007 events
2007 in Ivory Coast